Pierre Gauthier (31 August 1894 – 6 July 1972) was a Liberal party and a Bloc populaire member of the House of Commons of Canada.

Gauthier was born in Deschambault, Quebec and became a physician in 1921 after studies at Collège de Sainte-Anne-de-la-Pérade of the Séminaire de Québec then at Université Laval.

He entered provincial politics under the Quebec Liberal Party after winning a provincial by-election in Portneuf electoral district on 31 October 1927. He was re-elected to the Legislative Assembly of Quebec in the 1931 general election, then defeated in 1935. He was provincial Liberal party whip from 1931 to 1935.

On 27 January 1936, Gauthier won a federal by-election at the Portneuf riding, becoming a Liberal party member of Parliament. He was re-elected there in 1940. In 1941 and 1942, he served as a captain in the Royal Canadian Army Medical Corps. In 1943, he left the federal Liberals to join the Bloc populaire party which was opposed to World War II conscription.

Gauthier resigned his federal seat on 20 July 1944 in an unsuccessful bid to win a seat for the Quebec provincial wing of the Bloc populaire. Gauthier returned to the federal Liberals and was re-elected to Parliament in 1945. He was re-elected for further federal terms in 1949, 1953 and 1957. He was defeated in 1958 by Aristide Rompré of the Progressive Conservative party.

Electoral record

References

External links
 
 

1894 births
1972 deaths
Members of the House of Commons of Canada from Quebec
Bloc populaire canadien MPs
Liberal Party of Canada MPs
Physicians from Quebec
People from Capitale-Nationale
Quebec Liberal Party MNAs